Zhao Jianhua (born 21 April 1965) is a Chinese former badminton player who competed internationally from the mid-1980s to the early 1990s. He was admired for his speed and power as well as for his deception and technique.

Career 
Zhao won the 1991 IBF World Championships in singles, beating Alan Budikusuma in the final. He also won a bronze medal at the 1987 IBF World Championships. He is a two-time winner of the prestigious All England singles title (1985, 1990), and won the quadrennial Asian Games title on both occasions (1986, 1990) that he contested it, defeating his fellow countryman Yang Yang in the final on each occasion. He was a member of China's world champion Thomas Cup (men's international) teams in 1988, and 1990.

Zhao Jianhua competed in badminton at the 1992 Summer Olympics in men's singles and was seeded #1. In the first round he had a bye, and in the second round he defeated Darren Hall from Great Britain. In the round of 16 Zhao beat Deepankar Bhattacharya from India and in quarterfinals he lost to Hermawan Susanto from Indonesia 15–2, 14–17, 17–14. He is currently the head coach of Guangxi Province Badminton Club.

Achievements

World Championships 
Men's singles

World Cup 
Men's singles

Asian Games 
Men's singles

Asian Championships 
Men's singles

IBF World Grand Prix (9 titles, 8 runners-up)
The World Badminton Grand Prix sanctioned by International Badminton Federation (IBF) from 1983 to 2006.

Men's singles

References 
 Profile

1965 births
Living people
Sportspeople from Nantong
Badminton players from Jiangsu
Chinese male badminton players
Badminton players at the 1992 Summer Olympics
Olympic badminton players of China
Badminton players at the 1986 Asian Games
Badminton players at the 1990 Asian Games
Asian Games gold medalists for China
Asian Games silver medalists for China
Asian Games medalists in badminton
Medalists at the 1986 Asian Games
Medalists at the 1990 Asian Games
World No. 1 badminton players